The Donegal Harvest Rally is a motoring rally that takes place annually in County Donegal, Ireland. The rally is organised by the Donegal Motor Club takes place in Gweedore in the Donegal Gaeltacht.

The 2022 rally (the last of the National Rally Championship) was postponed following the Creeslough explosion.

References

External links
  (archived)
 Donegal Motor Club

Motorsport competitions in Ireland
Rallying
Sport in County Donegal